This list of presidents of Italy lists each president in order of term length. This is based on the difference between dates; if counted by number of calendar days all the figures would be one greater.

Of the 12 presidents, only two, Giorgio Napolitano and Sergio Mattarella, served for more than one term.

See also
List of presidents of Italy
List of prime ministers of Italy by time in office

Presidents of Italy
Italy, Presidents
Italy, time in office
Presidents, time in office